Suree Sukha (born July 27, 1982) is a Thai retired professional footballer who played as a defender.

Personal life
Suree's twin younger brother Surat was also a footballer who played as a midfielder.

Club career

Suree formerly played for Manchester City F.C. following a two-week trial with fellow Thai internationals Kiatprawut Saiwaeo and Teerasil Dangda,. Sukha's contract was set to be signed by the English club, but his work permit application was denied by the British Home Office as players originating from countries outside of the FIFA-ranked top 70 do not qualify according to Home Office guidelines. He also failed to pass on a clause requiring players to have participated in 75% of their country's internationals in the two years previous to the submission of the permit application.

After a long wait, Sukha finally signed for Manchester City along with fellow Thai internationals and City trialists Kiatprawut Saiwaeo and Teerasil Dangda on 16 November 2007, on the same day that his former club, Chonburi, announced a partnership agreement with his new club.

On 9 May 2008, Sukha was quoted in the Bangkok Post, as stating his future would lie in either China or Australia after his loan spell at Grasshoppers Zurich.

On 9 December Suree announced via Facebook on Tuesday evening by casting a long thank you to both the staff coach, teammates, and everyone who takes part in his football careers before the official retirement with 38-year-old.

International goals

Honours

Club
Buriram United
 Thai Premier League: 2013, 2014, 2015
 Thai FA Cup: 2013, 2015
 Thai League Cup: 2013, 2015 
 Toyota Premier Cup: 2014, 2016
 Kor Royal Cup: 2013, 2014, 2015, 2016
 Mekong Club Championship: 2015

International 
Thailand U-23
 SEA Games Gold Medal; 2005

References

External links
Profile at Goal

1982 births
Living people
Suree Sukha
Twin sportspeople
Suree Sukha
Suree Sukha
Association football defenders
Balestier Khalsa FC players
Suree Sukha
Manchester City F.C. players
Grasshopper Club Zürich players
Suree Sukha
Suree Sukha
Singapore Premier League players
Swiss Super League players
Thai expatriate footballers
Thai expatriate sportspeople in Singapore
Thai expatriate sportspeople in the United Kingdom
Thai expatriate sportspeople in Switzerland
Expatriate footballers in Singapore
Expatriate footballers in England
Expatriate footballers in Switzerland
Suree Sukha
Footballers at the 2006 Asian Games
2007 AFC Asian Cup players
Suree Sukha
Southeast Asian Games medalists in football
Competitors at the 2005 Southeast Asian Games
Suree Sukha